Lucha Underground premiered on El Rey Network on October 29, 2014. It focuses on professional wrestling matches, with commentary from the former WWE commentator Matt Striker and the former World Championship Wrestling wrestler Vampiro. Video packages highlighting wrestlers or storylines, air throughout each broadcast as well as several interactions between either the wrestlers themselves or with storyline promoter Dario Cueto, who is portrayed as a heel.

At the end of season 4, 127 episodes of Lucha Underground have aired.

Series overview

Episodes

Season 1 (2014–15)

Season 2 (2016)

Season 3 (2016–17)

Season 4 (2018)

References

External links
 

Lucha Underground
Professional wrestling-related lists